Irina Dmitrievna Anurina (born April 11, 1999, Kaluga) is a Russian draughts player, and a member of the Russian national team. Master of Sports of Russia (2015). Winner  of the Russian championship in Russian drafts (2019).

Biography

Sports career
Pupil of Sports school Checkers Russian in Kaluga.

In 2014  Women's Cup of Russia won a fast program and became the third in the classical program. At the Youth World Championship in checkers-64 in 2014, Irina won silver in a lightning game, bronze in quick checkers and silver in the classical program, all three awards   in the age category from 14 to 16 years.

In the Russian championship of Russian checkers in 2017 won silver in the  blitz  program. In March 2019 Irina won the competition in the fast game and took the 3rd place in the lightning game.

Family
Mother Elena Anurina, she is  Irina's coach. Father Dmitry Anurin, champion of Kaluga on Russian drafts.

References

External links 
 Profile on FMJD
 Лучшие спортсмены  Калужской области
 Profile on KNDB
 Награды юных шашисток из Калуги
 В Калуге чествовали лучших атлетов и их тренеров // Vesti-Kaluga

1999 births
Sportspeople from Kaluga
Living people
Russian draughts players
Players of Russian draughts